Benito Rigoni (11 April 1936 – 23 December 2021) was an Italian bobsledder who competed in the early 1960s. 

Rigoni was born in Asiago on 11 April 1936. He won a bronze medal in the four-man event at the 1964 Winter Olympics in Innsbruck. Rigoni died in Dueville on 23 December 2021, at the age of 85.

References

External links
 
 
 

1936 births
2021 deaths
Italian male bobsledders
Olympic bobsledders of Italy
Olympic bronze medalists for Italy
Olympic medalists in bobsleigh
Bobsledders at the 1964 Winter Olympics
Medalists at the 1964 Winter Olympics
People from Asiago
Sportspeople from the Province of Vicenza